The Șpring is a right tributary of the river Boz in Romania. It flows into the Boz in Drașov.

References

Rivers of Romania
Rivers of Alba County